Lee Olesky is an American financial executive and entrepreneur. He is co-founder, Chairman and Chief Executive Officer of Tradeweb (Nasdaq: TW), an international financial services company that builds and operates electronic over-the-counter marketplaces for trading fixed income products, ETFs, and derivatives.

Olesky is a central figure in the development of electronic trading in the global financial markets, an "electronic-trading pioneer" according to Fortune Magazine who built "a $21 billion juggernaut that has completely upended the Byzantine world of bond trading.". He is a frequent commentator on technology, the modernization of markets, and the growth of electronic trading.

Education 

Olesky earned a B.A. in history from Tulane University and a J.D. from George Washington University Law School.

Career

Credit Suisse First Boston 

In 1989, Olesky joined Credit Suisse First Boston, then known as First Boston, where he worked on derivatives. From 1993 to 1999 he worked in a variety of management positions, ultimately as Chief Operating Officer for the Fixed Income Americas division. While at Credit Suisse, Olesky co-wrote the business plan for Tradeweb, assembled a consortium of investors, and helped launch Tradeweb as a multi-bank joint venture in 1998, creating the first multi-dealer online marketplace for U.S. Treasury Securities. He served as the first chairman of Tradeweb's board of directors.

BrokerTec Global 

In 1999, Olesky left Credit Suisse and relocated to London to co-found BrokerTec Global, another joint venture platform. He served as the founding CEO until BrokerTec was acquired in 2002 by ICAP plc, a UK-based inter-broker dealer business focused on electronic financial markets and post-trade business for financial institutions.

Tradeweb 

Following the acquisition of BrokerTec Global, Olesky rejoined Tradeweb as President in 2002. He remained in London, where he focused on building out Tradeweb's presence in Europe, as well as the company's expansion into derivatives and Asia, the sale of Tradeweb to Thomson Reuters in 2004, and the acquisition of LeverTrade in 2006.

In 2008, Olesky returned to New York and was appointed CEO of Tradeweb. That same year, he led the acquisition of Hilliard Farber. In 2011, he led the acquisition of the brokerage division of Rafferty Capital Markets to expand Tradeweb's presence in the institutional market. In 2013, Olesky led the acquisition of BondDesk to further expand Tradeweb's presence in the retail market.

Following two decades of private ownership, Olesky led Tradeweb's IPO on the New York Stock Exchange (NYSE) on April 4, 2019. Olesky has led Tradeweb from an early-stage startup with $8 million in financing to becoming one of the most successful IPOs of 2019.

Throughout 2020 and 2021, as the COVID-19 pandemic prompted an increased shift to remote work, Olesky highlighted the accelerated reliance on electronic trading. Olesky told The Wall Street Journal's Matt Wirz, "The vast majority of folks inside Tradeweb and at our clients are working remotely, and that change in environment provided an opportunity for firms like us. Having a good digital source of information and ability to execute is key."

In February 2022, Olesky was appointed Chairman of the Board of Tradeweb and announced he would retire as CEO at the end of 2022.   Billy Hult will succeed him as CEO at the start of 2023.

Other positions held 

Olesky serves on the board of trustees of Mount Sinai Health System in New York City, and is a member of the board of Credit Benchmark, a provider of consensus credit risk analytics. Olesky is a member of the International Advisory Board of BritishAmerican Business and a member of the Leadership Council of Habitat for Humanity New York City and Westchester County. He was previously a member of a member of the SEC's Fixed Income Market Structure Advisory Committee (FIMSAC) and the Commodity Futures Trading Commission (CFTC) Technology Advisory Committee (TAC).

Awards and Honors 

Olesky has received numerous awards and honors over the course of his career, including 11 appearances in Institutional Investor's annual rankings of the industry's top financial technology innovators.       He was named CEO of the Year by Markets Media in 2019, and received the BritishAmerican Business Entrepreneurial Award in 2016. In 2022, Olesky was included in the "TabbFORUM 40" list of financial market Innovators and was named "Person of the Decade" in the 2022 U.S. Markets Choice Award.

References

External links 
 Tradeweb.com bio

American chief executives of financial services companies
American corporate directors
George Washington University alumni
Tulane University alumni
1961 births
Living people